Big Dada is a British independent record label imprint distributed by Ninja Tune. It was started by reputed hip hop journalist Will Ashon in 1997. It is best known for marketing of prominent British hip hop artist Roots Manuva, poet and playwright Kae Tempest, grime pioneer Wiley, rapper and designer DELS and Mercury Prize winners Speech Debelle and Young Fathers.

History
Big Dada's first release was Alpha Prhyme's 12-inch single Misanthropic, a collaboration between Luke Vibert and Juice Aleem in 1997. Over the following years, the label has released over one hundred and fifty records and garnered considerable critical acclaim, being described by Observer Music Monthly as "the very best underground hip hop label."

In 2007, Big Dada released the compilation Well Deep to celebrate their tenth anniversary. NME said the label was "not only a platform for the British urban underground but also attracts some of the most progressive wordsmiths and beat-scientists in the whole world... Big Dada are still pushing things forward." As the quote suggests, Big Dada is not exclusively a label for British acts. Their roster has also featured contributions from American hip hop artists including Bigg Jus, Busdriver, Mike Ladd and French hip hop group TTC. They also released debut albums by both Diplo and Spank Rock, as well as the comeback album from grime legend Wiley, who was so pleased with the record deal they offered that he recorded "50/50" in tribute.

On 8 September 2009, Speech Debelle won the 2009 Barclaycard Mercury Prize for her debut album Speech Therapy produced by Wayne Lotek. It is the label's third nomination, after Roots Manuva's Run Come Save Me in 2002 and Ty's Upwards in 2003. On 30 October 2014, Young Fathers won the 2014 Barclaycard Mercury Prize for their debut album Dead. It was the label's joint fourth nomination alongside Everybody Down by Kae Tempest and second Mercury Prize winning album.

Roots Manuva, one of the label's best known artist, signed a new deal with the label in 2011. In the 2007 documentary for the label Well Deep, he said, "It's been a lovely relationship over the years... Big Dada's unique and it will always be unique because it's a philosophy, y'know? It's unique because it dares to stick its neck out and it's run by people who genuinely love music. It's not just a record label, it's a movement."

In 2021 Big Dada relaunched "as a label run by Black, POC & Minority Ethnic people for Black, POC & Minority Ethnic artists."

Roster (current)

Congo Natty
Hype Williams
Lyzza
Kae Tempest
King Geedorah
Onyx Collective
Rahill
PVA
Roots Manuva

Sampa the Great
Two Fingers
Visionist
WEN
Yaya Bey
Young Fathers

Roster (alumni)

Anti-Pop Consortium
Baishe Kings
Busdriver
Bang On!
Cadence Weapon
Cell Broco
cLOUDDEAD
 Darq E Freaker
DELS
Diplo
Dobie
Elan Tamara
FARAI
Gamma
Infesticons
Infinite Livez
 Wiley
Jammer
Juice Aleem
K-The-I???
Kai Whiston
Kail
Kutmah
Lotek Hifi
Majesticons
New Flesh
NMS / Bigg Jus / Orko Eloheim
 Offshore
Paris Suit Yourself

Part 2
 Roseau
 Run the Jewels (Killer Mike & El-P)
 Samuel
Spank Rock
Speech Debelle
Sticky
Thavius Beck
Thunderheist
 Tre Mission
TTC
Ty

Visions
XRABIT +DMG$

Compilation discography
 Black Whole Styles (1998)
 SOUND01: A Big Dada Sampler (2001)
 Extra Yard: The Bouncement Revolution (2002)
 Well Deep: Ten Years of Big Dada Recordings (2007)

See also
 List of record labels
 List of independent UK record labels

References

External links
 Official website
 Ping Pong Promotion agency of Big Dada in France.

British independent record labels
Record labels established in 1997
Hip hop record labels
British hip hop record labels
Ninja Tune
British companies established in 1997
1997 establishments in England
Companies based in London